Kho kho at the 2016 South Asian Games were held in Guwahati, India from 10 – 15 February 2016.

Medalists

Medal table

References

External links
Official website

2016 South Asian Games
Events at the 2016 South Asian Games
South Asian Games